Radom Governorate was a governorate of Congress Poland.

History
It was created in 1844 from the merger of the Sandomierz Governorate with Kielce Governorate. Its capital was in Radom (previously a capital of the Sandomierz Governorate).

It was divided into 8 powiats: Kielce, Miechów, Olkusz, Opatów, Opoczno, Radom and Sandomierz.

In 1866 the Kielce Governorate was once again made an independent entity, and thus split off from the Radom Governorate.

Language
By the Imperial census of 1897. In bold are languages spoken by more people than the state language.

References and notes

 
Governorates of Congress Poland
States and territories established in 1844
History of Lesser Poland
Establishments in Congress Poland